José Antonio "Joss" Garfias Martínez Lavín (born 2005) is a Mexican racing driver currently racing in the Formula Regional European Championship for Monolite Racing. He previously competed in the GB3 Championship.

Racing record

Racing career summary 

* Season still in progress.

Complete GB3 Championship results 
(key) (Races in bold indicate pole position) (Races in italics indicate fastest lap)

Complete Formula Regional European Championship results
(key) (Races in bold indicate pole position) (Races in italics indicate fastest lap)

References

External links 
 

Living people
Mexican racing drivers
BRDC British Formula 3 Championship drivers
Formula Regional European Championship drivers
2005 births
Monolite Racing drivers
NACAM F4 Championship drivers
MP Motorsport drivers